Joculator minutus is a species of minute sea snail, a marine gastropod mollusc in the family Cerithiopsidae. The species was described by Cecalupo and Perugia in 2012.

Distribution
This marine species occurs off Papua New Guinea.

References

 Cecalupo A. & Perugia I. (2012) Family Cerithiopsidae H. Adams & A. Adams, 1853 in the central Philippines (Caenogastropoda: Triphoroidea). Quaderni della Civica Stazione Idrobiologica di Milano 30: 1-262.
 Cecalupo A. & Perugia I. (2018). New species of Cerithiopsidae (Gastropoda: Triphoroidea) from Papua New Guinea (Pacific Ocean). Visaya. suppl. 11: 1-187

Gastropods described in 2012
minutus